Maximilian Patrick "Ski" Fiske (October 12, 1888 in Chicago, Illinois – May 25, 1928 in Chicago, Illinois) was a pitcher for the Chicago Federals professional baseball team in 1914.

External links

1888 births
1928 deaths
Chicago Whales players
Major League Baseball pitchers
Eau Claire-Chippewa Falls Orphans players
Chicago Keeleys players
Baseball players from Chicago